Girl2K is 2021 Thai television series starring Sushar Manaying (Aom), Pathompong Reonchaidee (Toy), and Jumpol Adulkittiporn (Off). The series follows Momay, who has been cursed to be immortal and must fall in love to remove the curse.

The series was first announced by GMMTV at their "New & Next" event on 15 October 2019. Girl2K premiered on 17 February 2021 on GMM 25, airing on Wednesdays and Thursdays at 20:30.

Summary 
Momay is turn 2000 years old. For your centuries she has never aged, never gotten sick, and never died. Having tried an hundreds of methods to kill herself over and over again and always failing, Momay was finally sees a ray of light at the end of the tunnel when her friend, Krateng, who is a fortuneteller, tells her that she will be able to age and pass on if she finds the love of her life within this year. The problem is - there are four candidates. Thawin -her hardworking and generous boss, Khun Prom, - who is their company's biggest client, Kampun -a sweet young man, and Moo Tod -the dashing new guy. Four candidates and one year to be find the love of her life. But who's the right one?

Cast and characters 
Below are the cast of the series:

Main 
 Sushar Manaying (Aom) as Momay
 Pathompong Reonchaidee (Toy) as Moo Tod
 Jumpol Adulkittiporn (Off) as Thawin

Supporting 
 Pattadon Janngeon (Fiat) as Kampan
 Utt Panichkul as Mr. Prom
 Rudklao Amratisha as Kanyao
 Chaleumpol Tikumpornteerawong (Jack) as Oab
 Passakorn Ponlaboon (Fern) as Jelly
 Kornrawich Sungkibool (Junior) as Krating

Guest role 
 Phatchara Thabthong (Kapook) as Punpun
 Tawan Vihokratana (Tay ) as Matt
 Sutthipha Kongnawdee (Noon) as Mr. Prom's fling
 Suttatip Wutchaipradit (Ampere) as Insurance saleswoman
 Jirawat Wachirasarunpat (Wo) as Hotel's Manager
 Suporn Sangkaphibal as Mrs. Chailai / "Jisoo"
 Chayanit Boonsopit (Eve) as June June

Reception

Thailand television ratings 
In the table below,  represents the lowest ratings and  represents the highest ratings.

 Based on the average audience share per episode.

References

External links 

 GMMTV

Television series by GMMTV
2021 Thai television series debuts
2021 Thai television series endings
Thai fantasy television series
Thai romantic comedy television series
GMM 25 original programming